Cinquini is an Italian surname. Notable people with this surname include:
Maria Cibrario Cinquini (1905–1992), Italian mathematician, married to Silvio
Mattia Cinquini (born 1990), Italian footballer
 (born 1960), Italian field hockey player and coach
Muzio Cinquini (died 1627), Italian Catholic bishop
Oreste Cinquini (born 1947), Italian sporting director
Renato Cinquini, Italian film editor
Roberto Cinquini (1924–1965), Italian film editor
 (1906–1998), Italian mathematician, married to Maria

Italian-language surnames